Love (ft. Marriage and Divorce) is a South Korean television series starring Sung Hoon, Lee Tae-gon, Park Joo-mi, Lee Ga-ryeong, Lee Min-young, Jeon Soo-kyeong and Jeon No-min. The first season aired on TV Chosun from January 23 to March 14, 2021, on Saturdays and Sundays at 21:00 (KST). This drama is available for worldwide streaming on Netflix.

The second season was aired on TV Chosun from June 12 to August 8, 2021, on Saturdays and Sundays at 21:00 (KST). It is available for streaming on Netflix. The second season finale episode reached a nationwide rating of 16.582%, making it the eleventh highest-rated drama in Korean cable television history.

The third season was aired on TV Chosun from February 16 to May 1, 2022. The last episode of this season recorded 10.39% nationwide viewership, which was its best for the season. It is available for streaming on Netflix.

Series overview

Synopsis
The series tells the story of three married couples, each in their 30s, 40s and 50s.

Cast

Main
 Sung Hoon (season 1-2), Kang Shin-hyo (season 3) as Pan Sa-hyeon, a lawyer
 Lee Tae-gon (season 1-2), Gee Young-san (season 3) as Shin Yu-shin, a psychiatrist 
 Park Joo-mi as Sa Pi-young, Yu-shin's wife, a producer of the radio show.
 Lee Ga-ryeong as Boo Hye-ryung, Sa-hyeon's wife, the radio show host.
 Lee Min-young as Song Won, a Chinese translator and the mistress of Sa-hyeon.
 Jeon Soo-kyeong as Lee Si-eun, a writer of the radio show
 Jeon No-min as Park Hae-ryun, Si-eun's husband, a professor of Department of Theater.
 Moon Sung-ho as Seo Ban, an engineer of the radio show, Pi-young, Hye-ryung and Si-eun's colleague. (season 2-3; recurring season 1)
 Bu Bae as Seo Dong-ma, Ban's younger brother, Ga-bin's ex-boyfriend. (season 2-3; recurring season 1)
 Song Ji-in as A Mi, a model and the mistress of Yu-shin. (season 2; recurring season 1, 3)
 Lim Hye-young as Nam Ga-bin, a musical actress, Hae-ryun's colleague and mistress. (season 2; recurring season 1, 3)

Supporting
 Kim Eung-soo as Pan Mun-ho, Sa-hyeon's father
 Kim Bo-yeon (season 1-2), Lee Hye-sook (season 3) as Kim Dong-mi, Yu-shin's stepmother
 Roh Joo-hyun as Shin Gi-rim, Yu-shin's father
 Lee Hyo-chun as Mo Seo-hyang, Pi-young's mother (season 1-2)
 Lee Jong-nam as So Ye-jeong, Sa-hyeon's mother
 Han Jin-hee as President Seo, Ban and Dong-ma's father (season 3)
 Yoon Seo-hyun as Jo Woong, Dean of Chinese Medicine Hospital, A Mi's biological father. (season 1-2)
 Jeon Hye-won as Park Hyang-gi, Si-eun and Hae-ryun's daughter, Woo-ram's elder sister.
 Im Han-bin as Park Woo-ram, Si-eun and Hae-ryun's son
 Park Seo-kyung as Shin Ji-ah, Yu-shin and Pi-young's daughter
 Shin Soo-ho as Attorney Yoon, Sa-hyun's colleague (season 1-2)
 Bae Yoo-ri as Joon-jae, the Pan Family's housekeeper (season 1-2)

Special appearances
 Yoon Hae-young as Ji Su-hui, A Mi's mother (season 1-2)
 Hong Ji-min as Oh Jin-a, friend of Hae-ryun and Ga-bin (season 1, 3)

Season 1 
 Oh Seung-ah as Lee Yeon-hee, a colleague of Pi-young, Hye-ryung and Si-eun
 Shin Joo-ah as Lee Soo-jung, the wife of Yeon-hee's boyfriend
 Hyun Suk as Mun-ho's friend
 Seo Yu-ri
 April 2 (Band)
 Park Jun-myun as Audrey

Season 2 
 Lee Sook as Mo Seo-ri, Seo-hyang's younger sister
 Hong Ji-yoon as a clerk of diamond jewelry store
 Lim Baek-cheon as a guest on a radio program hosted by Boo Hye-ryung
 Park Sang-min as himself

Production
Five years after announcing her retirement from the industry, television screenwriter Phoebe signed an exclusive management contract with Jidam Inc. in early August 2020 and stated that her next project would air in the first half of 2021.

In Season 3, Lee Tae-gon and Sung Hoon are confirmed not to appear in this season. The drama staff later said that the production of season 3 and actors Sung Hoon and Lee Tae-gon have not been confirmed and are in talks.

On October 29, 2021, it was reported that Kang Shin-hyo will be playing the role of Pan Seo-hyun, the original role of Sung Hoon who withdrew.  And agency Ace Factory says it has received an offer and is considering it. Later on October 30, 2021, it was reported that Kwon Hyuk-jong will join the cast as Shin Yu-shin, played by Lee Tae-gon, who withdrew.

On January 25, 2022, the season 3 broadcast is confirmed to air on February 26, 2022.
On March 18, 2022, it was reported that actor Kang Shin-hyo was confirmed with COVID-19, having been diagnosed on the 17th, performed a rapid antigen test and the result was positive and will leave the containment area on March 23.

On April 14, 2022, it was confirmed that Actress Song Ji In was diagnosed with coronavirus 19 on April 13 and is currently undergoing treatment.

Original soundtrack

Season 2

Part 1

Viewership
Season 1
A 6.9% viewership rating was recorded nationwide for the series premiere, making it the current highest-rated drama of TV Chosun, surpassing Queen: Love and War, Kingmaker: The Change of Destiny, and Grand Prince.

The eighth episode logged a nationwide average viewership of 9.656%, making it the thirty third highest-rated drama in Korean cable television history.

Season 2
According to Nielsen Korea, the final episode of the second season aired on August 8, 2021, scored an average nationwide rating of 16.582%, which is the highest rating in two seasons, breaking its own record for the highest viewership ratings achieved by any drama in TV Chosun history. The second season became the eighth highest-rated drama in Korean cable television history.
 Season 3
According to viewer ratings research firm Nielsen Korea, 32nd episode aired on May 1, recorded 10.395% nationwide viewership. It was the highest viewership ratings for season 3. 

Season 1

Season 2

Season 3

Notes

References

External links
  
 
 
 
 Love (ft. Marriage and Divorce) at Naver 

TV Chosun television dramas
2021 South Korean television series debuts
2022 South Korean television series endings
Television series by Chorokbaem Media
Korean-language Netflix exclusive international distribution programming